Lakes Creek is a suburb split between Rockhampton Region and Shire of Livingstone, Queensland, Australia. In the  Lakes Creek had a population of 552 people.

Geography 
The suburb is bordered to the south-west by the Fitzroy River. The bulk of the land is mountainous and undeveloped rising to peaks such as:

Much of this undeveloped mountainous land in the north-east of the locality is within the Mount Archer National Park.

The developed land use is a mix of residential and industrial. Teys Australia operate a large abattoir and feedlot in Lakes Creek. In 2013 it was the largest employer in Rockhampton with a staff of over 1000 people.

The Rockhampton–Emu Park Road runs through from west to south.

History 
On 14 September 1871, residents of the area who were mostly employees of the Central Queensland Meat Preserving Company held a meeting to establish a school in the area at which it was estimated that 25 children would attend the school if established. Although the building was completed in January 1872, Lakes Creek Provisional School did not open until 1 October 1872 but closed in 1874, reopening on 21 May 1877. In July 1894, the Queensland Government decided that the numbers of students in the area warranted a state school. In January 1895 Lakes Creek State School opened on the present site.

Lakes Creek Baptist Church opened on Tuesday 3 March 1914.

In the  Lakes Creek had a population of 552 people.

Education 
Lakes Creek State School is a government primary (Prep-6) school for boys and girls at 445 Paterson Street. In 2016, the school had an enrolment of 127 students with 8 teachers (7 full-time equivalent) and 9 non-teaching staff (5 full-time equivalent). In 2018, the school had an enrolment of 102 students with 8 teachers (7 full-time equivalent) and 12 non-teaching staff (7 full-time equivalent).

Amenities 
Rocky Wesleyan Church is at 446 Paterson Drive. It is part of the Wesleyan Methodist Church.

References 

Suburbs of Rockhampton Region
Shire of Livingstone